Doug Pollard (born August 28, 1957) is a Canadian former soccer player who played as a defender.

Career  
Pollard played in the National Soccer League in 1975 with London City and the Ontario Selects. The following season he played with Windsor Stars, but was released on July 12, 1976. In 1977, under new head coach Ivan Marković he re-signed with Windsor for the 1977 season. He played another season with Windsor in 1978. In the winter of 1978 he played indoor soccer in the Major Indoor Soccer League with New York Arrows.

In 1979, he played in the North American Soccer League with Rochester Lancers. In the winter of 1979 he resumed playing with the New York Arrows. In 1980 he played with Hartford Hellions. In 1983, he played in the Windsor and District Soccer League with Windsor Croatia.

References 

1957 births
Living people
Canadian National Soccer League players
Canadian soccer players
Hartford Hellions players
London City players
New York Arrows players
Rochester Lancers (1967–1980) players
Major Indoor Soccer League (1978–1992) players
North American Soccer League (1968–1984) players
Soccer players from London, Ontario
Association football defenders